Art – Das Kunstmagazin is a monthly art magazine founded by Wolf Uecker and first published by Gruner + Jahr in 1979. Its original editor-in-chief, Axel Hecht, was replaced by Tim Sommer in 2005. The magazine features both new and established contemporary artists across all disciplines (including painting, sculpture, design, and video art) as well as reports on exhibitions and projects. 

In 2001, Art assimilated the Swiss monthly art magazine Artis – Zeitschrift für neue Kunst, which had been published by Hallwag, Bern and Stuttgart-Ostfildern since 1950.

References

Further reading

External links 

 
 Publisher's profile

Visual arts magazines published in Germany
Monthly magazines published in Germany
Gruner + Jahr
Magazines published in Hamburg
Magazines established in 1979
German-language magazines